Dat Boi is an Internet meme originating from the clip art website Animation Factory. The meme garnered popularity on Tumblr in 2015 before gaining more recognition through Twitter in 2016. It is usually accompanied by a person saying "here come dat boi" with the reply "o shit waddup!".

History 
According to Animation Factory employee Ryan Hagen, the frog GIF used in the meme was created by designer Josh Doohen.

The meme's name originates from an edited news screenshot and the line of text often used in association with the image ("here come dat boi! o shit waddup!") was taken from a different meme featuring a computer-animated Pac-Man character from a video called "Here Comes Pacman". The frog image and its caption were first put together on Facebook, according to Vox. The Verge writer Chris Plante referred to the caption in a June article, stating that the Dat Boi image itself was "not enough" and should be paired with the caption.

In May 2016, the "here come dat boi!" caption came under criticism after various Facebook users claimed to find it an "appropriation of African-American Vernacular English". As a result, certain Facebook groups discouraged use of the meme.

Dat Boi was featured in The Guardian "Month in Memes" article for June 2016. Matt Furie, creator of Pepe the Frog, explained in a June 2016 interview with Comic Book Resources that he was "devastated" to find out that Dat Boi had "begun to overshadow Internet Pepe".

Notable uses 
Meme-themed commercials and games based on the 2016 edition of Nickelodeon's Kids Pick the President featured both of the phrases associated with Dat Boi.
In May 2016, MTV News posted an image of Dat Boi, alongside other social media trends, onto its Instagram account.
Nintendo tweeted an image of its Slippy Toad character next to the Dat Boi frog on May 13, 2016.
The Twitter account for the restaurant chain Denny's tweeted an image of Dat Boi, calling the frog "Dat Busboi".
The Twitter account for Roblox, a computer game, retweeted a GIF featuring four avatars created in Dat Boi's likeness.
Kenyatta Cheese, co-founder of Know Your Meme, described Dat Boi as "a piece of culture" to the editors of Vice.
In an interview with PopSugar about viral trends, model Josh Ostrovsky mentioned the meme and admitted, "obviously I love Dat Boi".
The Australian Manufacturing Workers Union posted a "Dat Boi" meme to comment on the 2016 Australian federal election.
Also during the 2016 federal election in Australia, SBS Comedy published a satirical article claiming that the "Dat Boi" frog had become the most popular candidate for Prime Minister of Australia among youth voters.

See also 
 Toad worship, Chinese internet subculture

References 

2010s fads and trends
Fictional frogs
Internet memes introduced in 2015
Internet memes
Computer-related introductions in 2015